Fabio Andrés Legarda Lizcano (Popayán, Cauca, 18 November 1989—Medellín, Antioquia, 7 February 2019) artistically known as Legarda, was a Colombian singer and internet personality. He made himself known in 2016 through his single "La Verdad", and later by singles as "Ya Estoy Mejor", which he made a remix with singer Andy Rivera.  He also collaborated with singer Leslie Shaw in 2017.

Hours after his death, the music video for the song "Nutella" was released on YouTube, where he collaborated with Dejota and Ryan Roy.

Biography

Beginnings and career 
Legarda was born on 18 November 1989 in Popayán, Cauca, Colombia, but from an early age he moved to Atlanta, United States. At age 11 he began to devote himself to musical composition. Working with multi Platinum selling, Grammy Award Winning Record producer/writer Arnold Hennings combined the RnB and Colombian heritage to create Fabio’s iconic innovative style and flow. His musical style was mostly urban. He reached greater popularity for his participation in the competition program of RCN Televisión MasterChef Celebrity. Following his participation in the program, he began a relationship with YouTuber and singer Luisa Fernanda W, with whom he worked to compose singles.

Death 
Legarda died on 7 February 2019, after being injured by a stray bullet fired during an attempted, unrelated car theft (and which happened to hit the Uber car he was riding at the time, near the location of the theft) in Medellín, Antioquia, Colombia. The singer entered the hospital with a diagnosis of "very severe brain damage". At 4:50 p.m. He went into cardiorespiratory arrest, and after several attempts at resuscitation, died at 5:15 p.m. of that same day.

On 10 February 2019, a tribute to the singer was made at the La Macarena Show Center in Medellín which was presented by YouTuber Luisa Fernanda W and members of the singer's family. The event was attended by several renowned YouTubers and singers such as Andy Rivera, Pasabordo and Pipe Bueno among others, which offered a live concert in homage to Legarda. Several emotional messages from singers such as Carlos Vives, Maluma, Sebastián Yatra and Karol G were also screened live. Finally, the prosecution authorized the singer's parents to cremate the body to later be taken to Atlanta.

Discography

Singles 

Musical videos
 "Nutella" (2019; Ryan Roy & Dejota)
 "Chevereando" (2019; Daniela Darcourt)
 "11:11" (2018)
 "Otra vez" (2018; Itzza Primera, Luisa Fernanda W, Dejota 2021, Ryan Roy)
 "Modo avión" (2018)
 "Roma" (2018; Itzza Primera)
 "Uber Sex" (2018; Dylan Fuentes)
 "Necesito tu amor" (2017; B. Howard, Brasco)
 "Volverte a ver" (2017; Leslie Shaw)
 "Ya estoy mejor" (Remix) (2016; Andy Rivera)
 "La Verdad" (2016)

Songs
 "Te encontraré" (2017)
 "Libre" (2017; Mr. Jukeboxx)
 "Hipnotizado" (2016; Mr. Jukeboxx)
 "Mala es" (2016)
 "Clavos" (2016)

References 

1989 births
21st-century Colombian male singers
2019 deaths
Spanish-language YouTubers
Colombian YouTubers
People from Popayán
Deaths by firearm in Colombia